Indrek Hargla (real name Indrek Sootak; also used pseudonyms Andrei Golikov and Marat Faizijev; born on 12 July 1970 in Tallinn) is an Estonian writer. He is one of the most prominent Estonian writers of science fiction and crime novels. His most notable work is the Apothecary Melchior series, where activity takes place in medieval Tallinn.

In 1993 he graduated from University of Tartu, studied jurisprudence. After graduation, he worked at the Estonian Ministry of Foreign Affairs. Since 2012, he has been a professional writer.

He has won many awards, e.g. 17 times Estonian 'Stalker' science fiction prize.

Works
 Apteeker Melchior ja Oleviste mõistatus. Tallinn: Varrak, 2010, 310 pp
 Apteeker Melchior ja Rataskaevu viirastus. Tallinn: Varrak, 2010, 286 pp
 Apteeker Melchior ja timuka tütar. Tallinn: Varrak, 2011, 431 pp
 Apteeker Melchior ja Pirita kägistaja. Tallinn: Varrak, 2013, 404 pp
 Apteeker Melchior ja Tallinna kroonika. Tallinn: Varrak, 2014, 469 pp
 Apteeker Melchior ja Gotlandi kurat. Pärnamäe: Raudhammas, 2017, 558 pp
 Apteeker Melchior ja Pilaatuse evangeelium. Pärnamäe: Raudhammas, 2019, 467 pp

References

Living people
1970 births
Estonian male novelists
Estonian male short story writers
Estonian science fiction writers
Crime novelists
Mystery writers
Estonian screenwriters
21st-century Estonian novelists
Writers from Tallinn
Writers of historical mysteries
University of Tartu alumni
21st-century short story writers
21st-century screenwriters
21st-century male writers
Male screenwriters